Stephanie Nguyen (born 31 December 1986) is a Danish dancer, singer and actress. Her father is Vietnamese and her mother is Danish. She was member of the short-lived girl trio Little Trees from 2001 to 2002. In 2007, she won the largest street dance competition, Juste Debout, in France. In 2012, she was selected as a dancer for Madonna's The MDNA Tour.

Filmography 
 StreetDance 3D, 2010
 StreetDance: The Moves, 2010
 Beat the World, 2011
 StreetDance 2, 2012

References

External links 
 

Danish female dancers
21st-century Danish actresses
1986 births
Living people
Danish film actresses
Danish people of Vietnamese descent
21st-century Danish  women singers